Eugene Edward Robertson (December 25, 1899 – October 21, 1981) was a professional baseball player who played infielder in the Major Leagues from -. He played for the St. Louis Browns, New York Yankees, and Boston Braves.

In nine seasons, Robertson was in 656 games played, with 2,200 at-bats, 615 hits, batting .280 with 311 runs scored, 20 home runs, 250 RBI, an on-base percentage of .344 and a slugging percentage of .373. He played in the 1928 World Series as a member of the Yankees, batting .125 (1-8) with 2 RBI.

External links

1899 births
1981 deaths
Major League Baseball third basemen
St. Louis Browns players
New York Yankees players
Boston Braves players
Columbus Senators players
Joplin Miners players
St. Paul Saints (AA) players
Portland Beavers players
Mission Reds players
Baseball players from St. Louis